is a Japanese actor. He appeared in more than 80 films since 1981.

Filmography

Film

Television

References

External links
 Official profile 
 

1955 births
Living people
People from Tokyo
Japanese male film actors
Japanese male television actors